Sentraal High School is a public high school in Bloemfontein in the Free State province of South Africa.

History 

On 11 September 1905, the Free Christian School (Vrije Christelike School) was established under the roof of the Reformed Church in Zastron Street, Bloemfontein. It was a humble beginning, when 50 learners were taughtvin their mother tongue by D.F. du Toit (Oom Lokomotief).

The number of learners soon outgrew the capacity of the church building and in 1908, after an education law ensured that the Dutch language alongside English would enjoy equal rights, it was conceded that the Free Christian School could now be converted into a state school.

On 1 July 1908, the name of the school would be changed to the Preparatory Practical School (Voorbereidende Praktiese Skool). A zinc building was erected in which the st. 4 and 5 learners were accommodated. In 1912, the number of pupils has already grown to 163. By 1922 the school had 720 pupils.

Notable alumni

Nelie Smith,  Springboks rugby player, scrumhalf (1963-1965)
Piet Greyling, Springboks rugby player, flanker  (1967-1972)
Edrich Krantz, Springboks rugby player, wing (1976-1981)
 Neil Powell, South Africa national rugby sevens team rugby player and coach
 Zola Budd, Middle-distance running
Elize Cawood, actress

References

External links 
 Official site 

Schools in the Free State (province)
Afrikaans-language schools